True Beauty (Korean: 여신강림; Hanja: 女神降臨; RR: Yeosin-gangnim;  The Advent of a Goddess), also known as The Secret of Angel and other names, is a South Korean manhwa written and illustrated by Yaongyi. First published in Naver Webtoon since April 2, 2018, it centers on a young woman who mastered the art of makeup in her teenage years in order to transform herself into a gorgeous "goddess" after being bullied and discriminated because of being perceived as ugly.

As of January 2022, the official English version of True Beauty has accumulated 6.6 million subscribers and 825.9 million views. The comic updates every Wednesday. True Beauty was the third most viewed series on WEBTOON in 2019 and a print version was released starting October 29, 2020 by Young Com. It was also adapted into a television series of the same name which premiered on tvN on December 9, 2020.

Plot 
In her teenage years, Jugyeong Lim  has been treated unfairly by her family and bullied by her enemies due to being perceived as ugly. She starts learning how to use makeup by binge-watching tutorial videos on the Internet. She masters the art and her makeover proves to be gorgeously transformative as she quickly rises to fame and people become awed at the sight of her newfound beauty. Soon, she makes an unlikely relationship with two of the handsomest, most popular boys at school: Lee Su-ho, who is the first to recognize her beyond her makeup, and Han Seojun, a "bad boy" who is not on good terms with Suho. Living in a society where people are judged based on their physical appearance, Jugyeong navigates through her high school days and into her college life while struggling to keep her makeup-less face a secret and facing various challenges with her self-esteem, love life and career.

The plot of True Beauty can de subdivided into the following story arcs:

 Jugyeong's high school story (Prologue, Chs. 1–58)
 "The advent of a goddess": Jugyeong learns and masters the makeup arts (Prologue,  1–3)
 Suho recognizes jugyeong beyond her make-up (Chs. 4–10)
 Soo-jin's plot against Jugyeong (Chs. 11–16)
 Jugyeong meets Seo-jun and Aiden (Chs. 17–24)
 Jugyeong becomes Gowoon's makeup artist (Chs. 25–28)
 The tragedy of Yoon Seyeon; S-ho and Seojun reconciles (Chs. 29–38)
 The summer break with Suho and Seojun (Chs. 39–47)
 The last year in high school and Suho's departure to Japan (Chs. 48–58)

 Into adulthood (Chs. 59-223)
 Jugyeong in college: life without Su-ho and falling in love with Seo-jun (Chs. 59–69)
 Jugyeong deals with her jealousy (Chs. 70–73)
 Jugyeong and Jin-su (Chs. 74–77)
 Seo-jun's multiple part-time jobs and his overnight Internet stardom (Chs. 78–86)
 Su-ho returns, Seo-jun recognizes Ju-kyung's bare face (Chs. 87–94)
 Seo-jun returns to idol training, Ju-kyung works under Selena Lee (Chs. 95–99)
 Ju-kyung deals with Seo-jun's jealousy (Chs. 100–109)
 Ju-kyung, Su-ho, Seo-jun and Aiden in Prince of Prince (Chs. 110–119)
 Ju-kyung's struggle with dating an upcoming idol; Ju-kyung and Seo-jun's break-up (Chs. 120–128)
 Ju-kyung and Seo-jun try to move on from their break-up (Chs. 129–135)
 Ju-kyung and Eun-hye (Chs. 136–143)
 Ju-kyung at the Lee Family's villa (Chs. 144–147)
 Seo-jun's song dedicated to Ju-kyung (Chs. 148–150)
 Soo-jin's ordeal with her abusive boyfriend (Chs. 151–158)
 Soo-jin starts leading a new life, Su-ho and Seo-jun continue fighting over Ju-kyung (Chs. 159–165)
 Da-jung's cheating boyfriend (Chs. 166–168)
 Su-ho becomes Ju-kyung's boyfriend (Chs. 169–174)
 Ju-kyung venturing into vlogging and her struggle against Jo Bo-jung (Chs. 175–185)
 Su-ho and his father reconciles; Ju-kyung stands up to Bo-jung (Chs. 186–190)
 Su-ho starts working as a cook under Mi-yeon; Ju-kyung helps Mi-yeon with her face scar (Chs. 191–194)
 Ju-kyung and Seung-ho (Chs. 195–199)
 Seo-jun suffering hardships in his career as an idol (Chs. 200–212)
 Ju-kyung's bare face becomes exposed to the netizens (Chs. 213–217)
 Ju-kyung runs away from home and finally learns to love her true self (Chs. 218–221)
 Conclusion (Chs. 222–223)

Characters

Main 

 Lim Ju-kyung
 a 22-year-old make-up artist and social media influencer; Su-ho's girlfriend and Seo-jun's ex-girlfriend; the protagonist of the webtoon. Ju-kyung is hooked to reading horror comic books and listening to heavy metal music. In her younger years, she bore the harsh consequences of not conforming to society's standards of beauty. In the family, she is treated less favorably over her two relatively good-looking siblings; at school, she is being bullied and is treated like an errand girl. Seeking for solutions in the Internet, she discovers a plethora of makeup tutorial videos and she soon masters the art to effectively transform herself into a gorgeous "goddess." Other than her family, the first two people who knew her real face are his boyfriend Su-ho, whom she had previously run into with her bare face a couple of times at a comic book store back in her high school years, and ex-boyfriend Seo-jun.
 Lee Su-ho
 a 22-year-old third-generation Korean-Japanese who works as a cook and aspires for a career in culinary arts; Ju-kyung's boyfriend and Seo-jun's best friend. Su-ho is a son of a famous Korean actor and a Japanese mother who is ethnically Korean but was born in Japan. Back in middle school, he became best friends with Seo-jun and Se-yeon, but after unintentionally ignoring Se-yeon moments before the latter's suicide, he becomes the object of Seo-jun's hostility. The immense guilt due to Se-yeon's death and the broken friendship with Seo-jun turns him into a cold and aloof boy who, unbeknownst to everybody, cannot sleep well and has also contemplated suicide. Sharing Ju-kyung's penchant for horror comic books, he sometimes runs into her inside a comic book store they both frequent and soon develops feelings for her. In high school, he is the first to recognize Ju-kyung beyond her makeup. He later reconciles with Seo-jun after opening up about what really happened to him on the day of Se-yeon's suicide. He then becomes Ju-kyung's boyfriend.
 Han Seo-jun
 a 22-year-old solo K-pop artist under ST Entertainment; Ju-kyung's ex-boyfriend and Su-ho's best friend. Back in middle school, Seo-jun became best friends with Su-ho and Se-yeon after he rescued them from bullies. He becomes an idol trainee after being convinced by Se-yeon who, along with Su-ho, discovered his talent in singing. After Se-yeon's suicide, he broke his friendship with Su-ho (they reconcile later on) and stopped pursuing idol stardom. In high school, he had a crush for Ju-kyung but did not pursue her because of the mutual feelings between Su-ho and Ju-kyung. When Su-ho left for Japan for a few years, he becomes Ju-kyung's boyfriend and he revives his idol training. He later reluctantly accepts Ju-kyung's wish to break up after Ju-kyung suffered from the pressure and online criticism associated with dating an upcoming idol.

Supporting

Ju-kyung's family 
 Lim Hee-kyung
 Ju-kyung and Ju-young's elder sister; employee at ST Entertainment. Hee-kyung frequently goes home drunk after work. She is close to Ju-kyung.
 Lim Ju-young
 Ju-kyung and Hee-kyung's younger brother.
 the Lim siblings' mother
 she frequently discriminates Ju-kyung over Hee-kyung and Ju-young, though deep inside she also loves Ju-kyung.

Saebom High School 
 Kang Soo-ah
 Ju-kyung's best friend who is an ardent fan of boy idol groups. Soo-ah is supportive and protective of Ju-kyung.
 Kang Soo-jin
 a pretty social media celebrity who appears to despise Ju-kyung. Despite her perfect appearance, Soo-jin suffers from an alcoholic and abusive mother, a broken family and an eating disorder.
 Ahn Chae-rin
 a friend of Ju-kyung and Soo-ah.
 Han Joon-woo
 a teacher in Saebom High School who went out on a date with Hee-kyung.

Seo-jun's family and friends 
 Han Go-woon
 a student of Saebom High School; Seo-jun's younger sister. Go-woon has great singing talent, but she is ridiculed by her co-members in the music club for being chosen to take the lead role in a musical despite being not pretty.
 the Han siblings' mother
 Lee Pil-soo
 one of Seo-jun's friends.
 Wang Ji-hoon
 one of Seo-jun's friends.
 Jessie
 one of Seo-jun's friends; Pil-soo's girlfriend and owner of a clothes shop.
 Kim Aiden
 a biracial member of K-pop boy group PVC; formerly a trainee under ST Entertainment; Seo-jun and Ju-kyung's friend.

Su-ho's family 
 Lee Joo-heon
 a famous actor who works in both South Korea and Japan; Su-ho's father. After his Japanese wife died of cancer, Joo-heon allegedly started dating a co-star behind his children's backs. His apparently secret relationship was discovered by Su-ho on the day of Se-yeon's suicide; due to the mixed shock and indignation, Su-ho left home and unintentionally ignored Se-yeon's phone calls for help (which would be Se-yeon's last phone calls before his death).
 Lee Selena
 a famous make-up artist whom Ju-kyung admires; Su-ho's elder sister.

College acquaintances 
 Kim Jin-su
 Ju-kyung's fellow film student who asked her help in transforming his appearance to win Soo-jin's heart.
 Lee Ha-neul
 Ju-kyung's senior who is excessively clingy to her.
 Ahn Hyeon-woo
 a college student in industrial design who becomes Ju-kyung's groupmate in a class project.

ST Entertainment 
 Shin Hee-yeon
 a female K-pop idol under ST Entertainment who likes Seo-jun.
 Jeong Ji-hyuk
 a male K-pop idol under ST Entertainment.
 Kim Yeong-bin
 a male K-pop idol under ST Entertainment.
 Yeonjun
 a male K-pop idol under ST Entertainment.

Prince of Prince 
 Yang Jae-won
 a social media celebrity and contender in a TV fashion show Prince of Prince.
 Seo Hwi
 a model-environmentalist and contender in a TV fashion show Prince of Prince.

Others 
 Yoon Se-yeon
 a former member of K-pop boy group No-Time; Su-ho and Seo-jun's late best friend. Se-yeon was bullied back in middle school; he became friends with Su-ho, who attempted to rescue him but got beaten up also, and Seo-jun, who fought against the bullies to stop them, rescuing both Se-yeon and Su-ho. Talented in dancing, he became an idol trainee along with Seo-jun, but he was later invited to join a survival reality show that recruits members of a new idol group. He emerges as one of the finalists who debut as the group No-Time. Since his membership into the show, he has become a victim of harsh online shaming, the extreme stress that resulted led to him committing suicide. His tragic death becomes the center of the broken friendship between Seo-jun and Su-ho.
 Ji Woo-hyun
 Soo-jin's friend and Ju-kyung's ex-boyfriend. Unbeknownst to Ju-kyung, Woo-hyun went out with Ju-kyung in a fake relationship at Soo-jin's bidding. He broke up with Ju-kyung after Su-ho discovered that he already has a girlfriend.
 Yoo Eun-hye
 Ju-kyung's junior acquaintance at a makeup class. Eun-hye is revealed to be Seo-jun's sasaeng fan who secretly knew about Seo-jun's relationships with Ju-kyung and Su-ho. Knowing that Ju-kyung is Seo-jun's ex-girlfriend, she gets close with Ju-kyung and starts imitating her makeup and fashion. She also smuggles a hidden camera into Seo-jun's bedroom through a fan gift.
 Jo Bo-jung
 a vlogger and aspiring K-pop artist; Ju-kyung's former middle school classmate and one of her bullies. Notoriously selfish, arrogant, and haughty, she becomes envious of Ju-kyung's success in vlogging that she tried to destroy her career by attempting to smear her reputation.
 Lee Mi-yeon
 a chef and owner of a Japanese cuisine restaurant where Su-ho works; Su-ho's boss and Min-ji's mother. Mi-yeon has a large burn scar that disfigured half of her face due to a vehicular accident that resulted to their family's car bursting into flames; she had exposed herself to the fire just to keep her daughter safe while waiting for rescue to arrive.
 Kim Min-ji
 Mi-yeon's daughter and Su-ho's co-worker of her mother's restaurant. Min-ji loves her mother very much despite being teased by her peers because of her mother's disfigured face back in her younger years.
 Cha Seung-ho
 a male make-up artist and vlogger; Ju-kyung's friend and Seo-jun's make-up assistant. Like Ju-kyung, Seung-ho was also abused by his peers due to his looks and resorted to make-up in transforming himself into a handsome man.

Background and publication history

Naver WEBTOON 
The planning for the WEBTOON that would later be known as True Beauty started when WEBTOON author Kim Na-young, better known under her nom de plume Yaongyi, was in her late teens. She published the early version of True Beauty in Naver Comics' Challenge Comics, a platform for new, self-publishing WEBTOON's (akin to WEBTOON's CANVAS). In this version, the protagonist was male and was described by Yaongyi as a boy with a "warm appearance" and an "anime otaku."

After a break from webcomics, Yaongyi returned to working on True Beauty in her mid-twenties and changed its protagonist to the current female character Lim Ju-kyung but she kept the WEBTOON's theme of "true beauty," i.e. one's inner goodness is better than one's physical appearance. In an interview with Naver WEBTOON, she explained that though the readers may have enjoyed True Beauty with a male protagonist, she changed the protagonist from male to female since she aimed at creating an "approachable" and "easy-to-read" comic with a story that most readers can identify with.

Yaongyi also once worked as a fitting model before venturing into webcomics. This, combined with her penchant for fashion and cosmetics, helped her conceptualize True Beauty which would later be published as a formal Naver WEBTOON starting April 2, 2018 and has been running on a weekly basis on Mondays.

Various official translations of True Beauty were published on Naver's non-Korean WEBTOON platforms as early as May 2018, when the Thai and Indonesian versions were released starting on the 14th and 19th, respectively. The Chinese version followed on June 29, 2018 while the English version was released on August 14, 2018. In 2019, True Beauty was also translated into Spanish and French, released in November 21 and December 18, respectively.

Other names 
Since its international release, True Beauty has become known under other names other than its international English title and its literal English translated title. They are as follows:
 The Secret of Angel (in Indonesia)
 The Secret of a Goddess (in Thailand)
 Beauty Secrets (in Spain)

Print version 
A print version of True Beauty was released starting October 29, 2020 by Young Com.

Adaptations 

True Beauty has been adopted into a television series of the same name which premiered on tvN on December 9, 2020. The plan to adopt the WEBTOON into a television series was revealed in July 2019, and the casting of Moon Ga-young, Cha Eun-woo and Hwang In-yeop was confirmed by August 2020. Written by Lee Si-eun and directed by Kim Sang-hyeop, the series focuses on the original WEBTOON's high school story arc but with considerable changes in plot and characterizations. The main characters Lim Ju-kyung, Lee Su-ho and Han Seo-jun are played by Moon, Cha and Hwang, respectively, while the supporting character Kang Soo-jin was recharacterized, promoted to be one of the main characters of the series version and is played by Park Yoo-na.

Reception 
In 2019, the webtoon was nominated for the 2019 Next Manga Awards in the web category and was placed 4th out of 50 nominees.

Notes

References

External links 
 여신강림 (original Korean version)
 True Beauty (official English translation)

South Korean webtoons
Naver Comics titles
2010s webtoons
Romance webcomics
Coming-of-age webcomics
School webtoons
Comedy webcomics